Damir Mršić (born 25 October 1970) is a retired Bosnian professional basketball player. He also holds Turkish citizenship, under the name Demir Kaan, since 2003. He is one of Fenerbahçe's legendary club players, and was mostly known for his supreme three-point shooting ability.

Professional career
Mršić started his club career playing with the Sloboda Dita Tuzla youth team. He became a professional in 1989, and played three years with Sloboda Dita Tuzla. In 1992, he transferred to KK Split, where he won the Croatian Cup, in 1993 and 1994. 

In 1995, he transferred to the Turkish club Netaş, where he spent two years. After that, he spent 4 years at Tuborg İzmir, where he made a big impression in the Turkish League. Turkish giants Fenerbahçe Istanbul signed him for one year in 2001. 

After his Fenerbahçe experience, he moved to Russia to play with UNICS Kazan, where he won the Russian Cup. The next year, he played with Dynamo Moscow. In 2004, he moved back to Turkey, to Fenerbahçe İstanbul, which was going to merge with Ülkerspor at the time, and become Fenerbahçe Ülker. He spent 6 years there, and then retired.

National team career
Mršić was a member of the senior Bosnia and Herzegovina national basketball team. With Bosnia, he played at the 2001 EuroBasket, the 2003 EuroBasket, and the 2005 EuroBasket.

Awards and accomplishments

Pro club titles
2× Croatian Cup Winner: (1993, 1994)
Russian Cup Winner: (2003)
3× Turkish Super League Champion: (2007, 2008, 2010)
Turkish Supercup Winner: (2007)
Turkish Cup Winner: (2010)

Individual
Turkish League Top Scorer: (2000)
Turkish League Assists Leader: (2001)

Career statistics

Domestic leagues

References

External links
FIBA Profile
FIBA Europe Profile
Euroleague.net Profile
TBLStat.net Profile

1970 births
Living people
BC Dynamo Moscow players
BC UNICS players
Bosnia and Herzegovina emigrants to Turkey
Bosnia and Herzegovina men's basketball players
Bosniaks of Bosnia and Herzegovina
Fenerbahçe basketball coaches
Fenerbahçe men's basketball players
KK Sloboda Tuzla players
KK Split players
Shooting guards
Sportspeople from Tuzla
Tuborg Pilsener basketball players
Turkish men's basketball players